The Museu de Arte de Santa Catarina (MASC), was created in 1949 as Museu de Arte Moderna de Florianópolis (MAMF), and, since then, is the official institution for fine arts in Santa Catarina.

References

External links
Santa Catarina Art Museum

Art museums and galleries in Brazil
Museums in Santa Catarina (state)
Art museums established in 1949
1949 establishments in Brazil